Johan Stigefelt (born 17 March 1976) is a Swedish former Grand Prix motorcycle road racer and racing team manager.

Career
Born in Anderstorp, Sweden, Stigefelt won the Swedish road racing national championship twice in the 125cc category, in 1994 and 1995. He debuted in Grands Prix in 1997, racing in the 250cc class until 2000. In 2001 he had his only season in the premier class, the 500cc category, finishing twenty-second. After two more seasons spent in the 250cc class, Stigefelt moved to the Supersport World Championship in 2005, finishing eighth in 2006.

In 2005 he founded the Stiggy Racing team, that competed in the Supersport and Superbike World Championships until 2009. From late 2011 to late 2012, he was the RW Racing GP team manager competing in the Moto3 Championship. His team finished runner-up in 2012 with rider Luis Salom.

Stigefelt was appointed team manager of the Caterham Moto Racing Team for the 2014 Moto2 season and the team finished sixth in the Championship with rider Johann Zarco. After the Caterham Moto Racing team was disbanded, Stigefelt was chosen to manage the Sepang International Circuit’s new Moto3 team known as the SIC Racing Team. In 2015 the team contested the Moto3 Championship with Malaysian rider Zulfahmi Khairuddin and Czech rider Jakub Kornfeil. The SIC Racing Team competed in the 2016 Moto3 season with riders Jakub Kornfeil and Adam Norrodin.

Career statistics

Grand Prix motorcycle racing

Races by year
(key)

Supersport World Championship

Races by year

References

External links
Profile on MotoGP.com
Profile on WorldSBK.com

1976 births
Living people
People from Gislaved Municipality
Swedish motorcycle racers
500cc World Championship riders
250cc World Championship riders
Supersport World Championship riders
Motorcycle racing team owners
Sportspeople from Jönköping County